John Weir may refer to:
John Alexander Weir (1894–1942), Canadian lawyer and professor
John Angus Weir (1930–2007), fourth president of Wilfrid Laurier University
John Ferguson Weir (1841–1926), American painter and sculptor
John Jenner Weir (1822–1894), English amateur entomologist, ornithologist and British civil servant
John Weir (loyalist) (born 1950), Ulster loyalist
Johnny Weir (born 1984), American figure skater
John Weir (footballer), Scottish footballer
John Weir (writer) (born 1959), American writer
John Weir (geologist) (1896–1978), Scottish geologist and palaeontologist
John Weir (physician) (1879–1971), Physician Royal to several British monarchs
John Weir (politician) (1904–1995), Australian politician
John Weir (trade unionist) (1851–1908), Scottish trade unionist

See also

John Wier (disambiguation)